Leander is an unincorporated community in Fayette County, in the U.S. state of West Virginia.

History
The community was named in honor of Leander Brown, a businessperson in the railroad industry.

References

Unincorporated communities in Fayette County, West Virginia
Unincorporated communities in West Virginia